The World Harp Congress is a private nonprofit organization founded in 1981 as an outgrowth of the International Harp Weeks held in The Netherlands for twenty years under the leadership of Phia Berghout and Maria Korchinska.

The organization holds a triennial harp festival (also called the World Harp Congress) and promotes the performance of new music for the harp. The World Harp Congress also publishes a biannual journal entitled the World Harp Congress Review.

Events
 The eleventh World Harp Congress took place in Vancouver, Canada, in July 2011.
 The twelfth World Harp Congress took place in Sydney, Australia, in July 2014.
 The thirteenth World Harp Congress took place in Hong Kong in July 2017.
 The 14th World Harp Congress took place in Cardiff, Wales, in July 2022.

References

External links
 

Organizations established in 1981
Harp organizations